The H're people are an ethnic group of Vietnam, speaking a language in the Mon–Khmer family. Most H're live in the Quảng Ngãi and Bình Định provinces of Vietnam's South Central Coast, and numbered 149,460 in 2019.

In 1996 the H're people made up the majority of the population in the districts of Ba Tơ (numbering around 31,800 people there), Sơn Hà (which then also included Sơn Tây, 43,800 people), and Minh Long (8,100 people) in Quảng Ngãi Province. A third of the population of An Lão District in Bình Định Province were Hre in 1996 (around 5,800 people).

They sing the kaleu melody and play ching and aradon.

References

Nguyễn Thế Truyền. 2011. Nhạc khí của tộc người H'rê ở Quảng Ngãi. Hanoi: Nhà xuất bản văn hóa thông tin.

External links
Forces Hre Libres
Minority groups in the Republic of Vietnam, by American University (Washington, D.C.). Washington: Headquarters, Dept. of the Army, 1966

Hre
Quảng Ngãi province